Wilfrid Dewhurst Wills (15 October 1898 – 20 April 1954)  was a  Conservative Member of Parliament (MP) for Batley and Morley from 1931 to 1935.

The son of a Director of Wills Tobacco, he was born at Bromley, Kent and educated at Cheltenham College and the Royal Military College, Sandhurst. He served in both World Wars: as an Officer in the 5th Dragoon Guards from 1916 to 1919; and as a Lieutenant-Commander in the Royal Naval Volunteer (Wireless) Reserve from 1939 to 1945.

External links

Conservative Party (UK) MPs for English constituencies
1898 births
1954 deaths
UK MPs 1931–1935
People from Bromley
People educated at Cheltenham College
Graduates of the Royal Military College, Sandhurst
5th Dragoon Guards officers
Royal Naval Volunteer Reserve personnel of World War II